KWHS-LD (channel 51) is a low-power religious television station in Colorado Springs, Colorado, United States, owned and operated by the Christian Television Network (CTN). The station's transmitter is located atop Cheyenne Mountain.

History
The station, which signed on the air in 1992 and maintains a studio in Colorado Springs, was previously a semi-satellite of KWHD in Denver, owned by LeSEA Broadcasting (now Family Broadcasting Corporation). Both outlets shared the same programming with some exceptions. (KWHD is now KETD, carrying Estrella TV; the station does still operate a subchannel carrying a schedule of religious programming that remained identical to that of KWHS until 2018.)

In June 2014, it was announced LeSEA had inked an affiliation deal with Cozi TV, KWHS-LD was one of the stations that began carrying the channel. On July 1, 2017, Light TV replaced Cozi TV on KWHS-LD's subchannel.

On February 5, 2018, it was announced that LeSEA would sell KWHS-LD, along with Class A station KEEN-CD in Las Vegas and full-power station WHNO in New Orleans, to Clearwater, Florida-based Christian Television Network for $5.7 million. The sale was completed on April 23, 2018.

Technical information

Subchannels
The station's digital signal is multiplexed:

References

External links
Official website

Family Broadcasting Corporation
Television channels and stations established in 1992
1992 establishments in Colorado
Christian Television Network affiliates
WHS-LD
Low-power television stations in the United States